Lee Rogers may refer to:

 Lee Rogers (American singer) "I Want You To Have Everything" 1965, "Sex Appeal" 1968
 Lee Rogers (British singer) (born 1977), British singer-songwriter
 Lee Rogers (baseball) (1913–1995), American Major League Baseball pitcher
 Lee Rogers (podiatrist) (born 1978), American podiatrist and politician
 Lee Rogers (racing driver) (born 1972), British racing driver
 Lee Rogers (novelist), American pseudonym used by Robert "Bob" Rogers
 Lee Rogers (footballer, born 1967), English footballer (Bristol City, Hereford United, York City, Exeter City)
 Lee Rogers (footballer, born 1966), English footballer (Chesterfield)